Cedric Bonner (born December 14, 1978) is a former American football wide receiver in the National Football League, his last team being the Washington Redskins.  A 1997 graduate of H. Grady Spruce High School,  He played college football for Texas A&M University-Commerce.

On March 20, 2008, Bonner signed with the Toronto Argonauts of the Canadian Football League, but was later cut in training camp on June 5, 2008.

Bonner has recently begun to coach high school football. In 2009, he signed on as the offensive coordinator at F. L. Schlagle High School in Kansas City, Kansas. Currently he is serving as the wide receiver coach at Blue Valley High School in Stilwell, Kansas.

Notes

1978 births
Living people
Players of American football from Dallas
American football wide receivers
Texas A&M–Commerce Lions football players
Washington Redskins players
Atlanta Falcons players